The Purdue Boilermakers softball team represents Purdue University in NCAA Division I college softball.  The team participates in the Big Ten Conference. The Boilermakers are currently led by head coach Boo De Oliveira. The team plays its home games at Bittinger Stadium located on the university's campus.

History

Coaching history

Coaching staff

References

 
Big Ten Conference softball